Happy Now? is a 2001 British thriller film directed by Philippa Cousins.

Cast 
 Ioan Gruffudd - Max Bracchi
 Paddy Considine - Glen Marcus
 Susan Lynch - Tina Trent
 Emmy Rossum - Jenny Thomas / Nicky Trent
 Om Puri - Tin Man
 Richard Coyle - Joe Jones
 Robert Pugh - Hank Thomas

References

External links 

2001 thriller films
2001 films
British thriller films
2000s English-language films
2000s British films